Banharn-Jamsai Tower is the tallest tower in Thailand, and a main attraction of Suphan Buri Province. It in Chaloem Phatthara Rachinee Park, Tambon Tha Pee Leang, Mueang Suphan Buri District. It is named after former prime minister Banharn Silpa-archa and his wife Jamsai Silpa-archa.

Detail 
 Floor 1: entrance and souvenir shop
 Floor 2: food center and view point
 Floor 3: view point and souvenir shop
 Floor 4: view point (with telescopes) and historical exhibition

References 

Towers in Thailand
Buildings and structures in Suphan Buri province